The 9th Chamber of Deputies is the assembled legislature of the lower house of the Parliament of the Czech Republic following the election held on 8 and 9 October 2021. All 200 Members of Parliament (MPs) were elected to serve a 4-year term.

Current composition 
Below is a graphical representation of the Chamber of Deputies showing a comparison of party strengths as it was directly after the 2017 election. The graphic is not a seating plan.

List of elected MPs

References 

2021
2021 Czech legislative election